A metatheory or meta-theory is a theory whose subject matter is theory itself, aiming to describe existing theory in a systematic way. In mathematics and mathematical logic, a metatheory is a mathematical theory about another mathematical theory. Meta-theoretical investigations are part of the philosophy of science. A metatheory is not applied directly to practice, but may have applications to the practice of the field it studies. The emerging field of metascience seeks to use scientific knowledge to improve the practice of science itself.

Examples of metatheories

Metascience

Metascience is the use of scientific methodology to study science itself. Metascience seeks to increase the quality of scientific research while reducing waste. It is also known as "research on research" and "the science of science", as it uses research methods to study how research is done and where improvements can be made. Metascience concerns itself with all fields of research and has been described as "a bird's eye view of science." In the words of John Ioannidis, "Science is the best thing that has happened to human beings ... but we can do it better."

In 1966, an early meta-research paper examined the statistical methods of 295 papers published in ten high-profile medical journals. It found that, "in almost 73% of the reports read ... conclusions were drawn when the justification for these conclusions was invalid." Meta-research in the following decades found many methodological flaws, inefficiencies, and poor practices in research across numerous scientific fields. Many scientific studies could not be reproduced, particularly in medicine and the soft sciences. The term "replication crisis" was coined in the early 2010s as part of a growing awareness of the problem.

Measures have been implemented to address the issues revealed by metascience. These measures include the pre-registration of scientific studies and clinical trials as well as the founding of organizations such as CONSORT and the EQUATOR Network that issue guidelines for methodology and reporting. There are continuing efforts to reduce the misuse of statistics, to eliminate perverse incentives from academia, to improve the peer review process, to combat bias in scientific literature, and to increase the overall quality and efficiency of the scientific process.

A key issue is that whilst a metatheory is a more developed theory as it's based on other theory, it is open to those criticisms.

Metamathematics

Introduced in 20th-century philosophy as a result of the work of the German mathematician David Hilbert, who in 1905 published a proposal for proof of the consistency and completeness of mathematics, creating the field of metamathematics.  His hopes for the success of this proof were dashed by the work of Kurt Gödel, who in 1931, used his incompleteness theorems to prove this goal of consistency and completeness to be unattainable. Nevertheless, his program of unsolved mathematical problems, out of which grew this metamathematical proposal, continued to influence the direction of mathematics for the rest of the 20th century.

The study of metatheory became widespread during the rest of that century by its application in other fields, notably scientific linguistics and its concept of metalanguage.

A metatheorem is defined as: "a statement about theorems. It usually gives a criterion for getting a new theorem from an old one, either by changing its objects according to a rule" known as the duality law or duality principle or by transferring it to another area (from the theory of categories to the theory of groups) or to another context within the same area (from linear transformations to matrices).

Metalogic 

Metalogic is the study of the metatheory of logic. Whereas logic studies how logical systems can be used to construct valid and sound arguments, metalogic studies the properties of logical systems. Logic concerns the truths that may be derived using a logical system; metalogic concerns the truths that may be derived about the languages and systems that are used to express truths. The basic objects of metalogical study are formal languages, formal systems, and their interpretations. The study of interpretation of formal systems is the branch of mathematical logic  that is known as model theory, and the study of deductive systems is the branch that is known as proof theory.

Metaphilosophy 

Metaphilosophy is "the investigation of the nature of philosophy". Its subject matter includes the aims of philosophy, the boundaries of philosophy, and its methods. Thus, while philosophy characteristically inquires into the nature of being, the reality of objects, the possibility of knowledge, the nature of truth, and so on, metaphilosophy is the self-reflective inquiry into the nature, aims, and methods of the activity that makes these kinds of inquiries, by asking what is philosophy itself, what sorts of questions it should ask, how it might pose and answer them, and what it can achieve in doing so. It is considered by some to be a subject prior and preparatory to philosophy, while others see it as inherently a part of philosophy, or automatically a part of philosophy while others adopt some combination of these views.

Sociology of sociology 

The sociology of sociology is an area of sociology that combines social theories with analysis of the effect of socio-historical contexts in sociological intellectual production.

See also 
Meta-emotion
Metacognition
Metahistory (concept)
Metaknowledge
Metalanguage
Metalearning
Metamemory
Meta-ontology
Philosophy of social science

References

External links

Meta-theoretical Issues (2003), Lyle Flint

 
Metaphilosophy